Mohácsi Torna Egylet is a professional football club based in Mohács, Hungary, that competes in the Nemzeti Bajnokság III, the third tier of Hungarian football.

Honours
Mohács won the 2020-21 Baranya Megyei Bajnokság I season. Therefore, they were eligible for playing in the 2021-22 Nemzeti Bajnokság III season.

Domestic

Season results
As of 15 August 2021

External links
 Profile on Magyar Futball

References

Football clubs in Hungary
Association football clubs established in 1888
1888 establishments in Hungary